Neville Cottrell  (1927–2014) was an Australian rugby union footballer. A Queensland and national representative forward, he played fourteen Test matches for Australia, two as captain.

Early life
Cottrell was born in Brisbane, Queensland and attended St Laurence's College in there . He played in a Brisbane West End rugby side in "B" grade competitions before being invited to join the Brisbane YMCA side in the Queensland Premier competition coached by former Wallaby hooker Edward Bonis who mentored Cottrell on a rapid rise to the representative level.

Representative rugby career
His state representative debut was made for Queensland in 1947 against a touring All Blacks side. He was deemed too young to make the 1947–48 tour to the British Isles. By 1949 he was Australia's number one hooker and appeared again for Queensland against the New Zealand Māori and made his national representative debut with three Test appearances against the Māori visitors.

In 1949 he toured with Trevor Allan's Wallabies to New Zealand where they won the Bledisloe Cup for the first time in New Zealand and posted eleven wins from twelve games on tour. Cottrell played in both Tests and seven matches. With Allan out injured in 1950, Cottrell was picked to captain the Wallabies in a home Test series against the visiting British Lions. Both matches were lost.

He made seven further Test appearances, three in a 1951 home series against the All Blacks under the captaincy of Keith Winning and four in 1952 against Fiji (two) and New Zealand (two) under John Solomon.

Accolades
Cottrell was the first hooker to captain Australia and upon Cottrell's retirement only Eddie Bonis in the 1930s had made more Test appearances at hooker.

Howell quotes the Australian sports journalist Jack Pollard who wrote : 
.

Published references
 Howell, Max (2005) Born to Lead - Wallaby Test Captains, Celebrity Books, Auckland NZ

Footnotes

External links
 Nev Cottrell record at StatsGuru

1927 births
2014 deaths
Australian rugby union captains
Australian rugby union players
Australia international rugby union players
Rugby union players from Brisbane
Rugby union hookers